Marcus Valerius Messalla was a consul of the Roman Republic in 161 BC.

Nephew of Marcus Valerius Messalla (consul 226 BC), his consulate was remarkable chiefly for a decree of the senate prohibiting the residence of Greek rhetoricians at Rome. The Phormion and Eunuch of Terence were first acted in this year. Messalla, having been once degraded by the censors, became himself censor in 154 BC.

References 

 

Roman patricians
2nd-century BC Roman consuls
Roman censors
Marcus